Pegleromyces is a genus of fungi in the family Tricholomataceae. It is a monotypic genus, containing the single species Pegleromyces collybioides, found in Brazil, and described as new to science by mycologist Rolf Singer in 1981.

The genus name of Pegleromyces is in honour of David Pegler (b.1938), who is a British mycologist.

See also

 List of Tricholomataceae genera

References

Fungi of South America
Tricholomataceae
Monotypic Agaricales genera
Fungi described in 1981
Taxa named by Rolf Singer